The 2015–16 All-Ireland Senior Club Football Championship was the 46th annual  gaelic football club championship since its establishment in the 1970-71 season. The winners receive The Andy Merrigan Cup.

The defending champions were Corofin from Galway who defeated Slaughtneil Robert Emmets from Derry on 17 March 2015 to win their 2nd title. They were knocked out by Castlebar Mitchels of Mayo in the Connacht final in 2015-16.

Ballyboden St. Endas from Dublin won the title for the first time by defeating Castlebar Mitchels of Mayo  2-14 to 0-7 in the final at Croke Park on 17 March 2016. Daragh Nelson was the winning captain while Bob Dwan claimed the 'Man-of-the-Match' award.

Results

Connacht Senior Club Football Championship

Quarter-final

Semi-finals

Final

Leinster Senior Club Football Championship

First round

Quarter-finals

Semi-finals

Final

Munster Senior Club Football Championship

Quarter-finals

Semi-finals

Final

Ulster Senior Club Football Championship

Preliminary round

Quarter-finals

Semi-finals

Final

All-Ireland Senior Football Championship

Quarter-final

Semi-finals

Final

Championship statistics

Top scorers

Overall

In a single game

Miscellaneous

 On Monday 9 November 2015, Killarney Legion were chosen to represent Kerry in the Munster Championship even though they had not won the county championship at that time. This ruling by the Kerry County Board appears to be in breach of Rule 6.24(a) of the GAA official guide. The Kerry S.F.C. final ended in a draw the day before, meaning that the replay would have to be held on Saturday 14 November, in time for the Munster Semi-Final on Sunday 15th. Because of this, the Kerry County Board decided that Killarney Legion would represent Kerry regardless of whether they beat South Kerry or not in the replay, which was put back to Sunday 22 November (South Kerry can't represent Kerry in the provincial championship as they are a divisional side). This meant that Dingle, the Kerry club champions, were not permitted to represent Kerry in the Munster championship as they normally would if Killarney Legion had lost the county final.

References

All-Ireland Senior Club Football Championship
All-Ireland Senior Club Football Championship
All-Ireland Senior Club Football Championship